Malachi-Phree Jasiah Pate, known professionally as Jasiah, is an American rapper, songwriter and record producer from Dayton, Ohio who is currently signed to Atlantic Records. He is known for his usage of screaming in vocals and sinister lyrics.

Career 
In 2011, Jasiah began making beats using software Garage Band and Ableton. In 2016, he released his first project titled Antisocial Extrovert. In 2017, his song "HaHaHaHa" gained traction after his girlfriend sent the song to American rapper Ugly God who shared it on social media platform Twitter. He began gaining traction with the release of his single "Rip X" a tribute to late American rapper XXXTentacion. In July 2019, he released his debut album Jasiah I Am. In April 2022, he released his collaboration with American rapper 6ix9ine titled "Case 19". In September 2019, he released his single "Heartbreak" a collaboration with American drummer Travis Barker from the rock band Blink-182 alongside an accompanying music video. In April 2021, he released his second album War. In June 2021, he released his single "Art of War", a collaboration with American rappers Denzel Curry and Rico Nasty.

Musical style 
During a mixed review by Nadine Smith of Pitchfork, Jasiah's musical style on his album War is described in the following manner: "Jasiah’s music is ultimately indicative of his digital origins. Even more than hyperpop, WAR takes an accelerationist approach to rap, devouring a half-decade of online scenes and styles and spitting them out into a chewed-up psychedelic combination. He screams loud enough to make you listen, but it’s hard to tell if his shouts will sustain for longer than 15 minutes."

References

External links 
 

Living people
21st-century American rappers
African-American male rappers
African-American male songwriters
Rappers from Ohio
People from Dayton, Ohio
Songwriters from Ohio
Trap musicians
1996 births